Gemory (also Gremory, Gamori, Gaeneron, Gemon, Gemyem) is a demon listed in demonological grimoires.

Description 
Gemory is described in demonological works such as the Munich Manual of Demonic Magic
 the Liber Officiorum Spirituum the Pseudomonarchia Daemonum, the Lesser Key of Solomon, the Dictionnaire Infernal, as appearing in the form of a beautiful woman (though as with all Goetic demons referred to using the masculine pronouns "he" and "his") wearing a duchess's crown and riding a camel, ascribed with the power of revealing hidden treasures and answering questions about the past, present, and future.  The Munich Manual, Pseudomonarchia, Lesser Key, and Dictionnaire further give Gemory the power of procuring love from women (although the Liber Officiorum Spirituum describes her as "a companion of the love of women, and especially of maidens"), while the Pseudomonarchia and the Lesser Key note that the duchess's crown is (somehow) worn on Gemory's waist.  Stephen Skinner and David Rankine, in their edition of The Goetia of Dr Rudd, suggest that this was a mistranslation of the Latin cingitur which should have been translated "encircling her head".

Gemory is mentioned in a manuscript labelled Fasciculus Rerum Geomanticarum.

Legions and standing 

In the Pseudomonarchia, Lesser Key, and Dictionnaire, Gemory is ranked as a duke ruling 26 legions of spirits, but (still a duke) ruling 27 in the Munich Manual of Demonic Magic and ruling 5 or 42 legions as either a duke, prince, or captain, in the Liber Officiorium Spirituum.

According to Rudd, Gremory is opposed by the Shemhamphorasch angel Poiel.

In popular culture
In Highschool DxD, Gremory is one of the 72 Devil Noble Families of the Ars Goetia. The progenitor of the Gremory Clan, Runeas is regarded as the original Gremory Devil depicted in grimoires, legends and Bible spawned by the Mother of Devils Lilith. The main female protagonist, Rias Gremory is a member of the Gremory family and the lover of the protagonist Issei Hyodou.

In Fire Emblem: Three Houses, Gremory is a master rank class that specializes in healing and dark magic.

See also

Notes

References 

Goetic demons